Mark Jun Hashem is an American politician and a Democratic member of the Hawaii House of Representatives since January 19, 2011 representing District 18.

Education
Hashem attended Pacific University and earned his MA from Hokkaido University.

Elections
2012 Hashem was unopposed for the August 11, 2012 Democratic Primary, winning with 5,010 votes, and won the November 6, 2012 General election with 7,311 votes (56.3%) against Republican nominee Jeremy Low.
2010 When Democratic Representative Lyla Berg ran for Lieutenant Governor of Hawaii and left the District 18 seat open, Hashem won the three-way September 18, 2010 Democratic Primary with 2,525 votes (37.9%), and won the November 2, 2010 General election with 4,876 votes (48.4%) against Republican nominee Chris Baron.

References

External links
Official page at the Hawaii State Legislature
 

Place of birth missing (living people)
Year of birth missing (living people)
Living people
Hokkaido University alumni
Democratic Party members of the Hawaii House of Representatives
Pacific University alumni
21st-century American politicians